Terebra funiculata is a species of sea snail, a marine gastropod mollusc in the family Terebridae, the auger snails.

Description

Distribution

References

 Deshayes, G. P., 1859. A general review of the genus Terebra, and a description of new species. Proceedings of the Zoological Society of London 27: 270-321
 Pilsbry, H. A. (1921). Marine mollusks of Hawaii, VIII-XIII. Proceedings of the Academy of Natural Sciences of Philadelphia. 72: 296-328, pl. 12
 Bratcher, T., 1977. Deshayes' terebrid types in Ecole des Mines, Paris. The Nautilus 91(2): 39-42
 Severns, M. (2011). Shells of the Hawaiian Islands - The Sea Shells. Conchbooks, Hackenheim. 564 pp
 Liu, J.Y. [Ruiyu] (ed.). (2008). Checklist of marine biota of China seas. China Science Press. 1267 pp
 Steyn, D. G.; Lussi, M. (2005). Offshore Shells of Southern Africa: A pictorial guide to more than 750 Gastropods. Published by the authors. pp. i–vi, 1–289

External links
 Hinds, R. B. (1844). Descriptions of new shells, collected during the voyage of the Sulphur, and in Mr. Cuming's late visit to the Philippines. Proceedings of the Zoological Society of London. (1844) 11: 149–168.
 Pilsbry, H. A. (1921). Marine mollusks of Hawaii, VIII-XIII. Proceedings of the Academy of Natural Sciences of Philadelphia. 72: 296-328, pl. 12
 Fedosov, A. E.; Malcolm, G.; Terryn, Y.; Gorson, J.; Modica, M. V.; Holford, M.; Puillandre, N. (2020). Phylogenetic classification of the family Terebridae (Neogastropoda: Conoidea). Journal of Molluscan Studies. 85(4): 359-388

Terebridae
Gastropods described in 1844